Liberal People's Party (from 2001 Liberals) was a conservative-liberal political party in Finland, founded in 1965 as a reunification of the People's Party of Finland and Liberal League.

History 
Originally named Liberal People's Party, it restyled its name as Liberals in 2000.

Liberals was removed from the party registry in 2007 after the failure to gain a seat in two consecutive parliamentary elections. In 2011 the party dissolved itself as a political party. It continues its basic ideological policy as an independent think tank.

Leaders 
1965–1968 Mikko Juva
1968–1978 Pekka Tarjanne
1978–1982 Jaakko Itälä
1982–1984 Arne Berner
1984–1990 Kyösti Lallukka
1990–1992 Kaarina Koivistoinen
1992–1993 Kalle Määttä
1993–1995 Tuulikki Ukkola
1995–1997 Pekka Rytilä
1997–2000 Altti Majava
2000–2001 Oili Korkeamäki
2001–2005 Tomi Riihimäki
2005–2008 Ilkka Innamaa
2008–2011 Kimmo Eriksson
2011–2011 Jouni Flemming

Elections

See also
:Category:Liberals (Finland) politicians
Liberalism
Contributions to liberal theory
Liberalism worldwide
List of liberal parties
Liberal democracy
Liberalism and centrism in Finland

References

External links
 

Defunct political parties in Finland
Liberal parties in Finland
1965 establishments in Finland
2011 disestablishments in Finland
Political parties established in 1965
Political parties disestablished in 2011